The 1969 Texas Longhorns baseball team represented the University of Texas at Austin in the 1969 NCAA University Division baseball season. The Longhorns played their home games at Clark Field. The team was coached by Cliff Gustafson in his 2nd season at Texas.

The Longhorns reached the College World Series, finishing fourth with wins over eventual champion Arizona State and fifth-place Ole Miss and losses to runner-up Tulsa and semifinalist NYU.

Personnel

Roster

Schedule and results

Notes

References

Texas Longhorns baseball seasons
Texas Longhorns
Southwest Conference baseball champion seasons
College World Series seasons
Texas Longhorns